Austrarchaea mcguiganae is a species of spider in the family Archaeidae. It is endemic to Monga National Park in New South Wales, Australia.

References 

Spiders described in 2011
Archaeidae